Carlgren is a Swedish surname. Notable people with the surname include:

Andreas Carlgren (born 1958), Swedish politician
Anna Carlgren (born 1960), Swedish artist
Erik Carlgren (born 1946), Swedish sprinter
Patrik Carlgren (born 1992), Swedish footballer

Swedish-language surnames